Greg Owen may refer to:

Greg Owen (golfer) (born 1972), English professional golfer
Greg Owen (activist), British HIV/AIDS activist